WASP-159 is a faint star located in the southern constellation Caelum. With an apparent magnitude of 12.84, a powerful telescope is needed to see the star. The star is located  based on parallax, but is drifting away with a heliocentric radial velocity of +35.16 km/s.

Properties 
WASP-159 is a F-type subgiant with 1.41 times the Sun's mass, and double the Sun's radius. It radiates at 4.78 times the Sun's luminosity from its photosphere at an effective temperature of 6,120 K. WASP-159 is about 3 billion years old, and is metal-rich like many other planetary hosts.

Planetary system 
In 2019, SuperWASP discovered an inflated "hot Jupiter" orbiting the star.

References 

F-type subgiants
Caelum
Planetary systems with one confirmed planet
Hot Jupiters